Vintage Story is a sandbox survival game developed and published by Anego Studios. The founders of Anego Studios, Tyron and Irena Madlener, began development on a standalone version of an earlier mod for Minecraft called Vintagecraft. An old version of the game is available for free download. The game is in early access and can be played in singleplayer or multiplayer modes.

Gameplay 
The player character is a tall blue humanoid, referred to as a seraph by the game and developers. Gameplay is generally focused on creating a realistic and immersive experience. Creating many items revolves around interacting with the in-game world instead of a GUI. For example, in order to create a clay bowl, players place small voxels into the shape of a bowl.

Other aspects of gameplay include prospecting for minerals and ores, animal husbandry and farming, and building. Another focus of gameplay is exploration. Infinite worlds with realistic biomes and randomly generated structures provide an engaging player experience.

Development 
The game is written in C# using OpenTK and a fork of the ManicDigger game engine. Most of the game’s programming was done by Tyron Madlener, with contributions from several open source contributors. A majority of the game’s code is under a readable source code license on the Anego Studios GitHub .

One of the most popular features of the game is its modding API, which is praised for its flexibility and quality.

Reception 
Vintage Story has been praised by critics as having impressive depth and being on a completely different level to other block-based survival games. Power Up Gaming was impressed with the way it handles crafting and inventory management, noting that the game fixes all the "nagging problems that everyone has" in other open-world survival block-based games by allowing the player to open multiple menus at the same time and interact with items more naturally. After the release of the Seasons Update in 2020, Gaming On Linux praised the game mechanics as "rewarding" and having a "surprising amount of depth", despite having to play through a "slow and difficult" start. A critic found the content of Vintage Story to be a more atmospheric survival experience compared to Minecraft which "is far too tame to be believable."

Rock Paper Shotgun praised the world generation, animations, and modding. In another review Rock Paper Shotgun mostly focused on the much better performance of Vintage Story, compared to Minecraft. A review by Sportskeeda praised the graphics, as well as the mineralogy. Digital Trends heralded the unique gameplay and crafting system for their quality, as well as the flexibility of the game.

References 

2016 video games
Survival video games
Indie video games
Linux games
Video games developed in Austria
Video games using procedural generation
Windows games